Fredy Fautrel (born 31 October 1971) is a French football referee. Born in Avranches, Fautrel became a referee in 1993 and has been registered as a Fédéral 1 referee since 2003 meaning he is eligible to officiate Ligue 1 and Ligue 2 matches, as well as matches in the Coupe de France and Coupe de la Ligue. He also serves as a referee for UEFA and FIFA matches, having become a FIFA referee in 2007.

Fautrel has officiated in qualifiers for the Euro 2008 and 2010 World Cup tournaments.

References

External links
 FFF Profile

1971 births
Living people
French football referees
Sportspeople from Manche